Le cri is a 2006 French-Belgian television miniseries.

Plot
This saga tells what was the life of Metalworkers of Lorraine through the story of a working-class family: the Panaud. From 1845 until the blast furnaces closed in 1987, the life of this family scrolls across the screen with Robert Panaud key figure for the last of the family to do this job.

Cast

 Catherine Jacob as Renée Panaud
 Francis Renaud as Robert Panaud 
 Jean-Baptiste Maunier as Young Robert
 Jacques Bonnaffé as Jules Panaud
 Dominique Blanc as Pierrette Guibert
 Pascal Elso as Léon Brulé 
 Yolande Moreau as Marie
 François Morel as Ferrari
 Rocco Papaleo as Razza 
 Rufus as Monsieur Lesage
 Olivier Saladin as Paloteau
 Bruno Lochet as Angelmon
 Geneviève Mnich as Lulu
 Ivan Franek as Wisniesky
 Dominique Valadié as Roseline
 Pierre Aussedat as Marcel Panaud
 Martin Jobert as  Célestin Panaud
 Samuel Jouy as  Pierre Panaud
 Yann Collette as Fred
 Marina Golovine as Graziella
 Vittoria Scognamiglio as Monica
 Laura Quintyn as Young Graziella
 Hammou Graïa as Mohamed
 Nathalie Kanoui as Violette
 Noé Chadaigne as Julien
 Antoine de Prekel as Jeannot
 Florence Hebbelynck as Hortense
 Catherine Cyler as Doctor Dubois
 Suzanna Lastreto as Madame Fontana
 Alain Frérot as Monsieur Nobilet 
 Christian Pereira as Monsieur A
 Philippe du Janerand as Monsieur B
 Dominique Bettenfeld as Huguet
 Marcel Bozonnet as The Director
 Roger Dumas as The Accountant
 André Marcon as The Delegate

Episodes
 Episode 1 : L'Embauche
 Episode 2 : Le Licenciement
 Episode 3 : Le Sauvetage
 Episode 4 : La Fin d'un monde

External links
 

Belgian television miniseries
2000s French television series
2006 French television series debuts
2006 French television series endings
2000s French television miniseries